Jeffrey Pierce (born Jeffrey Douglas Plitt; December 13, 1971) is an American actor. He is known for playing the titular role in the science-fiction series Charlie Jade (2005), and for starring in the short-lived television series Big Apple (2001) and The Nine (2006–2007), and for his recurring roles on a number of television series. Pierce also provides the voice and motion capture for Tommy in the video game series The Last of Us, for which he received a BAFTA Award for Performer in a Supporting Role nomination in 2020.

Career
At age 25, he made his acting debut when he played Bill Drake in the 1997 episode "Soulmate" from the television series Pacific Blue. He has appeared in guest roles in a number of television series. His film performances include appearances in S1m0ne, The Foreigner and The Double.

Pierce took on his most notable role to date in the 2005 science-fiction television series Charlie Jade, in which he played the titular role; the series aired in the United States on Sci-Fi Channel in 2008. Pierce has recurring roles in the television series For the People, Alcatraz, Cult, The Tomorrow People, Bosch, and Castle Rock. 

In addition to his acting activities, Pierce also does voice acting of video game characters or provides the movement model. He provided the voice and motion-capture of the character Tommy Miller in the video game, The Last of Us, which became his most prominent role. Originally, Pierce auditioned for the role of Joel Miller, which was later given to fellow castmate Troy Baker. When the team was required to cast an actor for the role of Tommy, they immediately contacted Pierce, as they were impressed by his audition. He reprised his role in its 2020 sequel The Last of Us Part II, for which he was nominated for Performer in a Supporting Role at the 17th British Academy Games Awards. Pierce also appears in a guest role on HBO's The Last of Us television series, which is based on the video game.

Filmography

Film

Television

Video games

Notes

References

External links
 

1971 births
Living people
Male actors from Denver
Writers from Denver
American male film actors
American film directors
American film producers
American male television actors
American male voice actors
American male video game actors